Şehzade Mehmed (11 March 1605 – 12 January 1621) was an Ottoman prince, the second son of Sultan Ahmed I and the firstborn with his Haseki Kösem Sultan.

Life
Şehzade Mehmed was born on 11 March 1605 in Istanbul. He was the second son of Sultan Ahmed I and the firstborn with his favorite, Kösem Sultan. In January 1609, Mehmed began his education under the guardianship of Hoca Ömer Efendi, together with his elder half brother, Şehzade Osman (future Sultan Osman II).

According to contemporary European observers, Mehmed's disputed mother, Kösem Sultan, entertained ideas about his succession to the sultanate after the
death of Ahmed. Nasuh Pasha, during his grand vizierate (1611–14), especially after his marriage to Ayşe Sultan, daughter of Ahmed and Kösem in 1612, became a close ally of his mother-in-law, who apparently thought that Nasuh Pasha could be of help in securing the succession of Mehmed 

After his father's death in 1617, when Mehmed was twelve years old, his uncle Sultan Mustafa I ascended the throne. However, he was soon deposed and replaced by Osman in 1618.

Death
Osman had asked the Şeyhülislam Hocazade Esad Efendi for an affirmative legal opinion to execute his brother. However, Esad Efendi refused to issue legal opinion. The Chief Judge of Rumeli Kemaleddin Efendi instead affirmed the execution of the prince. And so on 12 January 1621, Mehmed was executed. When the executioners were stretching rope in his neck he spoke: 

Twelve days following his death, a harsh snow fall in Istanbul which was considered as Allah’s message to Osman that he killed his brother. Osman ordered Mehmed's execution before leaving the capital for the Polish campaign. 

He was buried beside his father in his mausoleum located in Blue Mosque, Istanbul.

In popular culture
In 2015 Turkish historical fiction TV series Muhteşem Yüzyıl: Kösem, Şehzade Mehmed is portrayed by Turkish actor Burak Dakak.

References

Notes 

 "Twelve days following his death, a harsh snow fall in Istanbul which was considered as Allah’s message to Osman that he killed his brother." This part actually wrong. Historian Celal Şengör saying "This winter is the part of the Little Ice Age, not because Şehzade Mehmed's curse."

For more information: Little Ice Age

Sources

1605 births
1621 deaths
17th-century Ottoman royalty